A statue of Ronald Reagan by Istvan Mate was installed in Budapest, Hungary, in June 2011.

References

Buildings and structures in Budapest
Monuments and memorials in Hungary
Monuments and memorials to Ronald Reagan
Cultural depictions of Ronald Reagan
Sculptures of men
Statues in Hungary
Statues of presidents of the United States